The Liquiçá Church massacre was a mass-killing that occurred in April 1999, during East Timor's bid for independence. It was the first case to be heard by the Second Special Panel.

Events and Aftermath

During the event, up to some 200 East Timorese people were murdered at the Liquica priest's house next to the local Catholic church. The event left many witnesses, including the local Catholic Priest, Raphael dos Santos. The total number of victims at the hands of pro-Indonesia militias (primarily the Besi Merah Putih) and Indonesian soldiers and police in Liquica has never been fully determined, ranging from a low of five claimed by Indonesia, to more than 200 by local sources.

The crime was first investigated by Australian diplomats at the invitation of the Indonesian Government, but the report wasn't released until 2001. Later it was investigated by a team of International Police which became known as the UNTAET Crime Scene Detachment, serving under the United Nations and representing the countries of the United States, Great Britain, and the Philippines, as well as Australian and New Zealand Military Police Crime Scene Specialists. The unit was initially commanded by police officer Steve Minhinett, of Great Britain. It was later commanded by American police officer Karl Clark, and relied heavily on American intelligence officer Allen Williams. This investigation led to a large number of exhumations of the dead, witness statements taken, and ultimately charges of assassination, torture, forced deportation and murder being filed against 21 Indonesian Officers, and pro-Indonesian East Timorese Militia.

The Liquiçá Church massacre and the attack at Manuel Carrascalão's house were two of the ten priority investigations of the Serious Crimes Unit. This case was the first of several indictments arising from these investigations to reach trial. The very first trial was to be heard by the Second Special Panel, consisting of Judge Benfeito Mosso Ramos (Cape Verde) presiding, Judge Antero Luís (Portugal) and Judge António Helder (East Timor). The hearing was conducted in five languages: Portuguese, English, Indonesian, Tetum and Tokodede, the local language of the Liquiçá area. The court heard detailed testimony from the accused about involvement in the Besi Merah Putih militia, including a militia ceremony in which they were allegedly forced to drink a cocktail of alcohol, animal blood and drugs before killing, as a part of the attack on the Liquiçá Church. Testimony implicated the direct participation in the attacks by Indonesian soldiers, who were allegedly dressed in civilian clothes to look like militia members. Leoneto Martins, Tomé Diogo, Eurico Guterres and João da Silva Tavares were the primary suspects and leading figures during the massacre, all were East Timorese.

See also 
 List of massacres in East Timor

References

External links
 Sydney Herald, Williams and Other Investigators Estimates
 ABC Online article on negotiations with Australia about border
 Genocide Watch, Besi Merah Puti - Alan Williams
 Health Alliance International website - More information on health projects in East Timor by HAI
 Jornal Nacional - Semanário (Portuguese)
 Links to Timor Leste government sites
 Ministry of Foreign Affairs and Cooperation
 Suara Timor Lorosae - (Tetum and Indonesian)
 CIA World Factbook on East Timor
 ETAN Links - Extensive links on East Timor
 Governo Timor Leste - Official governmental site
 

1999 in Christianity
Massacres in 1999
Indonesian occupation of East Timor
Massacres in East Timor
1999 in East Timor
Massacres in religious buildings and structures
April 1999 events in Asia
Attacks on churches in Asia